"Pull of the Eye" is a song by the Norwegian pop band Donkeyboy from their second studio album, Silver Moon, released on 27 February 2012 as the album's first single. The song peaked at number eleven in Norway.

Track listing 
Digital download 
 "Pull of the Eye" – 3:03

Chart performance

Release history

References

2012 singles
Donkeyboy songs
Warner Music Group singles
2012 songs
Songs written by Simen Eriksrud
Songs written by Simone Eriksrud
Songs written by Cato Sundberg